Carl Rushworth (born 2 July 2001) is an English professional footballer who plays as a goalkeeper for Lincoln City on loan from Brighton & Hove Albion of the Premier League.

Club career

Rushworth began his career with FC Halifax Town before signing for Brighton & Hove Albion. He signed for Worthing on a season-long loan in August 2019. He made 30 appearances in all competitions for the seventh tier side.

He signed a new three-year contract with Brighton in July 2020.

Rushworth moved on a season-long loan to League Two side Walsall in July 2021. He made his debut for the club on 7 August 2021 in the 1–0 away loss at Tranmere on the opening game of the 2021–22 season in what was also his Football League debut. On 5 January 2022, whilst on loan at Walsall, Rushworth signed a new contract with Brighton, committing to the club until 2025.

On 8 July 2022, Rushworth joined Lincoln City on a season-long loan deal. He made his Lincoln debut on the opening day of the season against Exeter City.

International career

In November 2019, Rushworth earned his first international call up when he was selected in Paul Simpson's squad for England U19's three UEFA European U19 Championship qualifiers against Luxembourg, Macedonia and Bosnia and Herzegovina, although he did not play.

He was part of the England U20 squads in October and November 2020, but did not play.

On 5 October 2021, Rushworth received his first call up to the England U21s as a replacement for Josh Griffiths. He was recalled in March 2022 for 2023 European under-21 Championship qualifying matches against Andorra and Albania.

Career statistics

References

2001 births
Living people
English footballers
FC Halifax Town players
Brighton & Hove Albion F.C. players
Worthing F.C. players
Walsall F.C. players
Lincoln City F.C. players
Isthmian League players
English Football League players
Association football goalkeepers